Netscape Web Server was an integrated software platform for developing and running transaction-oriented business applications on the web. It was developed originally by Kiva Software, which Netscape acquired in 1997.

When Netscape and Sun Microsystems formed the Sun-Netscape Alliance in 1999, the Netscape Web Server was chosen as the basis for their iPlanet Application Server offering over the NetDynamics Application Server, which had been acquired by Sun in 1998.

See also
 iPlanet
 Sun ONE
 Sun Java System
 Comparison of application servers

References

Web server software
Netscape